There are more than a dozen leader's residences in North Korea, according to Kim Jong-il’s former bodyguard Lee Young-kuk. Many of the residences were identified on satellite images in the North Korea Uncovered project. Ryongsong Residence is the central residence of Kim Jong-un. All residences are kept secret by the North Korean government and few photographs exist.

See also

 Official residence
 North Korean leaders' trains
 North Korea Uncovered
 List of leaders of North Korea
 Blue House - the southern equivalent in the Republic of Korea

References

External links
  – Project for comprehensive mapping of North Korea
  – Detailed satellite pictures of six North Korean leader's residences

Official residences
Kim dynasty (North Korea)
North Korea-related lists
Residential buildings in North Korea
Government buildings in North Korea